Midland Railway Action Group was established to improve the internal infrastructure of the Irish Midlands, in particular,  Mullingar, Tullamore, and Athlone, the Midland Railway Action Group (MRAG) is a pressure group striving to have the Athlone to Mullingar rail line re-opened, in order to serve the Midland Gateway towns of Athlone, Tullamore, and Mullingar with a transport corridor that answers the future and current requirements while remaining Kyoto friendly. More generally, other towns they claim would be positively affected by the desired re-opening of the Athlone -Mullingar rail link are Cavan, Clones, Longford, and Monaghan from the MRAG. 
Willie Allen is currently the M.R.A.G. spokesperson.

Rail Track Costings (at 2004 prices)

Priced per kilometre 
 Normal one track (no via-ducts nor bridges) = 5 to 10 M€
 Bridges and Viaducts  priced per kilometre = 30 to 50 M€  (one of two tracks is 0.6 of total cost)
 Tunnels for 21st century needs at 270 km/h mono-tube or one track per tube 100m square 30M€ to 50M€
 Tunnels that exceed 500m to 1 km, special security furnishings,  45M€ to 75M€ (averaged to 1 km for 3/4/7/10 km tunnel)
 TER Typical 21st century costings for regional rail transport are also available here.

Political Commitment
The minister of Finance Brian Cowen, proposes in his speech of 2 March 2007 mentions an allocation of 300M Euro for the best and most Suitable projects. According to the Indecon Strategic Development Framework for the Midlands Gateway, It is essential to invest seriously within the significantly insufficient infrastructure. Refer to this, detailed on page 124 125.

An Irish Rail spokesman said the services on the WRC would be operated by commuter rail-cars rather than Intercity trains. In fact, the only line being campaigned for which could see the use of Intercity carriages is the Athlone-to-Mullingar line, which was once part of the main line to Galway.

While local Midland Railway Action Group, and representatives of A.I.T campaigners have focused on the line's potential as a commuter route, some believe it could cut half an hour from rail journeys between Galway and Dublin. The 2003 strategic rail review found that restoring the line would cost €154 million, but this estimate has since been cut to €84 million.

References

 Railway Mobility Home Page
 Shannon_side_News
 Platform 11 Transport 21 Information
  Johnson, S. (1997). Johnson's Atlas & Gazetteer of the Railways of Ireland, Midland Publishing Ltd. .
  Report to the Minister for Transport from the Chairman of the Expert Working Group, May 2005 from The Department of Transport

For Irish Rail Transportation, See also 
 Iarnród Éireann
 Rail transport in Ireland
 History of rail transport in Ireland
 * Rail Users Ireland - Ireland's National Rail User organisation
 Transport 21

Political advocacy groups in the Republic of Ireland
Rail transport in Ireland